Tapio Olavi Sipilä (born November 26, 1958, in Kiiminki, Oulu), nicknamed Tapsa, is a former wrestler from Finland, who claimed the silver medal in the Men's Greco-Roman Lightweight Division (– 68 kg) at the 1984 Summer Olympics in Los Angeles. He won the bronze medal four years later in the same weight division at the 1988 Summer Olympics in Seoul, South Korea.

Results
1980 European Championship — 68.0 kg Greco-Roman (3rd)
1981 European Championship — 68.0 kg Greco-Roman (3rd)
1981 World Championship — 68.0 kg Greco-Roman (2nd)
1983 European Championship — 68.0 kg Greco-Roman (3rd)
1983 World Championship — 68.0 kg Greco-Roman (1st)
1986 European Championship — 68.0 kg Greco-Roman (6th)
1986 World Championship — 68.0 kg Greco-Roman (2nd)
1987 European Championship — 68.0 kg Greco-Roman (3rd)
1988 European Championship — 68.0 kg Greco-Roman (4th)

References
sports-reference

External links
 

1958 births
Living people
People from Kiiminki
Olympic wrestlers of Finland
Wrestlers at the 1980 Summer Olympics
Wrestlers at the 1984 Summer Olympics
Wrestlers at the 1988 Summer Olympics
Finnish male sport wrestlers
Olympic silver medalists for Finland
Olympic bronze medalists for Finland
Olympic medalists in wrestling
World Wrestling Championships medalists
Medalists at the 1988 Summer Olympics
Medalists at the 1984 Summer Olympics
Sportspeople from North Ostrobothnia
20th-century Finnish people
21st-century Finnish people